White Mountain Airport  is a state-owned public-use airport located one nautical mile (1.85 km) north of the central business district of White Mountain, a city in the Nome Census Area of the U.S. state of Alaska.

As per Federal Aviation Administration records, this airport had 2,516 passenger boardings (enplanements) in calendar year 2007, a decrease of 11% from the 2,821 enplanements in 2006.

Facilities 
It has one runway designated 15/33 with a 3,000 x 60 ft (914 x 18 m) gravel surface.

Airlines and destinations 

Prior to its bankruptcy and cessation of all operations, Ravn Alaska served the airport from multiple locations.

References

External links
 Airport diagram (GIF). Federal Aviation Administration, Alaska Region. 30 September 2004.
 

Airports in the Nome Census Area, Alaska